Kockelscheuer is a small town in the commune of Roeser, in southern Luxembourg.  , the town has a population of 261.  The Fortis Championships Luxembourg are held at the Kockelscheuer Sport Centre, just to the north of the town. The 2014 IIHF World Championship Division III were held at the Kockelscheuer Ice Rink in April 2014.
Each year Kockelscheuer held sponsored by BGL a tennis tournament, part of WTA.

External links

 
Roeser
Towns in Luxembourg